The Dălhăuți is a right tributary of the river Milcov in Romania. It flows into the Milcov near Câmpineanca.

References

Rivers of Romania
Rivers of Vrancea County